Collège Mixte Philadelphie – Dantès Bellegarde is a private school located north of the neighborhood of Turgeau, in Port-au-Prince, Haiti. The school was founded in 1958.

The school follows the Haitian Education System and offers lower to senior levels:
 elementary (1– 6 grades)
 middle (7–9 grades)
 high school ( 10 –12 grades)

Notes

Buildings and structures in Port-au-Prince
Educational institutions established in 1958
Schools in Haiti
1958 establishments in Haiti